Bob Florence (May 20, 1932 – May 15, 2008) was an American pianist, composer, arranger, and big band leader.

Career
A child prodigy, Florence began piano lessons before he was five years old and at seven gave his first recital. Although his early education was in classical music, he was drawn to jazz and big band. He went to Los Angeles City College and studied arranging and orchestration with Bob McDonald. He joined the college big band, and his classmates included Herb Geller and Tommy Tedesco.

Florence spent most of his career with big bands, as a leader, performer, composer, and arranger. After graduating from college, he was a member of bands led by Les Brown, Louis Bellson, and Harry James. His arrangement of "(Up A) Lazy River" for Si Zentner was a hit in 1960, and won a Grammy Award. Dave Pell hired him to work full-time as an arranger for Liberty Records. The job gave him the opportunity to write in several genres: bossa nova with Sérgio Mendes, jazz with Bud Shank, and pop vocal with Vic Dana.  Bob was the piano player on Bobby Vee's #1 hit "Take Good Care Of My Baby" in 1961

He worked often in Hollywood as a bandleader, composer, and arranger for TV variety shows, hosted by Dean Martin, Red Skelton, and Andy Williams, and he wrote arrangements for the Tonight Show band led by Doc Severinsen. He won an Emmy Award for a program by Linda Lavin (1981) and another for a concert by Julie Andrews (1990).

In 1979 he returned to a recording career that had been sidetracked by other work. Twelve years separated Pet Project (World Pacific, 1967) from Live at Concerts By The Sea (Trend, 1979). His album Magic Time (1984) was the first to be credited to his eighteen-piece big band, the Bob Florence Limited Edition. The band released albums throughout the 1980s and 1990s. In 2000, Serendipity 18 won the Grammy Award for Best Jazz Performance by a Large Ensemble. He received fifteen Grammy nominations during his career.

Florence died of pneumonia at the age of 75 on May 15, 2008, in Los Angeles.

Discography

As leader

As arranger/conductor
With Count Basie
 Basie on the Beatles (Happy Tiger, 1969)
With Louie Bellson
 The Brilliant Bellson Sound (Verve, 1959)
 Big Band Jazz from the Summit (Verve, 1962)
With Harry James
Harry James...Today! (MGM E/SE-3848, 1960)
The Solid Gold Trumpet of Harry James (MGM E/SE-4058, 1962)
With Sérgio Mendes
 The Great Arrival (Atlantic, 1966)
With Joe Pass
 A Sign of the Times (World Pacific, 1965)
With Bud Shank
 California Dreamin' (World Pacific, 1966)
 Michelle (World Pacific, 1966)
 Bud Shank & the Sax Section (Pacific Jazz, 1966)
 Bud Shank Plays Music from Today's Movies (World Pacific, 1967)
With Si Zentner
 Up A Lazy River (Liberty 1961)
 Mr. Nashville (RCA Victor 1966)

As sideman
With Julie Andrews
 Love Julie (USA Music Group, 1987)
With Sue Raney
 Sings the Music of Johnny Mandel (Discovery, 1982)
 Ridin' High (Discovery, 1984)
 Flight of Fancy: A Journey of Alan & Marilyn Bergman (Discovery, 1986)
With Brian Swartz Quartet
 Live at the Jazz Bakery (Summit, 2005)
With Bud Shank 
 Girl in Love (World Pacific, 1966)
 Taking the Long Way Home (Jazzed Media, 2006)
With Joanie Sommers
 Dream (Discovery, 1980 [rel. 1983])
 Here, There and Everywhere! (Absord [Japan], 2000 [rel. 2004])

See also
 List of jazz arrangers

References

1932 births
2008 deaths
American jazz pianists
American male pianists
Emmy Award winners
Grammy Award winners
American jazz bandleaders
American music arrangers
Big band bandleaders
Musicians from Los Angeles
Deaths from pneumonia in California
20th-century American pianists
Burials at Valley Oaks Memorial Park
Jazz musicians from California
20th-century American male musicians
American male jazz musicians
Summit Records artists